= Nazmi Zade al-Bagdadi =

Poet from Turkey

Nazmi Zade al-Bagdadi was a poet from the Ottoman Empire and the father of historian Morteza Effendi and writer Hussein Effendi. He died in 1066 AH (1655/1656 CE). He authored a collection of poetry in the Turkish language.

== Personal life ==
He had at least two children: the writer and translator Hussain Nazmi Zadeh, who died in 1717 and was the translator of the Book of Wassef al-Hadrah; and the historian and translator Mortada Nazmi Zadeh, who died in 1723 and was the author of The History of Baghdad, known as Kalashin Khalfa or Rawdah al-Khalafa.

== Death ==
Nazmi Zade died in 1655.
